"Love Someone" is a song by American singer-songwriter Jason Mraz. It was released on May 19, 2014, on Atlantic Records as the lead single from his fifth studio album, Yes!.

Background
Mraz and Mike Mogis produced the song. It was written by Mraz, Chris Keup and Stewart Myers, along with members of the indie-rock-folk band Raining Jane (Mai Bloomfield, Becky Gebhardt, Chaska Potter and Mona Tavakoli). They served as his band on the record. Mraz has been working with other artists in this way since 2007.

Track listing 
Download digital
Love Someone — 4:16

Download digital (9 Theory Remixes)
Love Someone (9 Theory Remix) — 3:31
Love Someone (9 Theory Magical Mystery Mix) — 4:53

Charts

Personnel
Jason Mraz – vocals, guitar, production

Raining Jane
Mai Bloomfield – vocals, cello, high strung guitar
Becky Gebhardt – bass
Chaska Potter – vocals
Mona Tavakoli – vocals, drums, percussion

Additional personnel
Mike Mogis – production
Chris Keup – co-production
Stewart Myers – co-production
Andy Powers – acoustic guitar, electric guitar, pedal steel, mandolin
Chris Joyner – organ, piano, tanpura drone
Ben Brodin – drums, percussion, piano
John O'Reilly – additional drums

Release history

References

2014 singles
2014 songs
Atlantic Records singles
Jason Mraz songs
Song recordings produced by Jason Mraz
Songs written by Jason Mraz